Reprisal is the second extended play by Australian electronic music duo Peking Duk, featuring two tracks: "Fire" and "Distant Arizona". The EP was released on 18 May 2018 and has peaked at number 12 on the Australian ARIA Singles Chart. "Fire" includes uncredited vocals from Melbourne songwriter Sarah Aarons, and was released to radio on 11 May 2018. Sales of "Fire" counted towards the EP's chart placement.

Inspired by spaghetti westerns and Quentin Tarantino, and by director-producer Ryan Sauer, the two songs combine to form "Reprisal"; a tale of vengeance and retribution.

Reception
auspOp said: "'Fire' is undoubtedly the most commercial of the two and is primed for commercial radio airplay", adding "'Distant Arizona' is a slightly grittier electronic piece, with Alister from Cloud Control providing the vocals." The website also called the project "seriously impressive".

Track listing

Charts

Weekly charts

Year-end charts

Certifications

Release history

References

2018 EPs
EPs by Australian artists
Peking Duk albums